"I Got My Game On" is a song written by Jim Collins, George Teren and Jamey Johnson, and recorded by American country music singer Trace Adkins.  It was released in August 2007 as the first single from his compilation album American Man: Greatest Hits Volume II. The song peaked at No.34 on the Hot Country Songs chart in the United States.

Popular culture
The song was later used as the theme song to Howie Long's Tough Guys show during the FOX Super Bowl XLII pre-game show.

Music video
The song's music video features Adkins and Rodney Carrington. It premiered in 2007 and was directed by Michael Salomon. Adkins won "Best Male Video" at the 2008 CMT Music Awards.

Chart performance

References

2007 singles
Trace Adkins songs
Capitol Records Nashville singles
Songs written by Jim Collins (singer)
Songs written by Jamey Johnson
Song recordings produced by Frank Rogers (record producer)
Music videos directed by Michael Salomon
Songs written by George Teren
2007 songs